Elías Mauricio Escalona Albornoz (born 22 November 1973) is a Chilean former professional footballer who played as an attacking midfielder for clubs in Chile and Colombia.

Career
A product of Huachipato youth system, he made appearances from 1992 to 1994. 

In second half 1994, he moved to Colombia and joined Cortuluá in the top division with Reinaldo Rueda as coach. In the squad, he coincided with his compatriots Carlos Molina (1994–2000) and Fabián Campos (1996), who came from Huachipato.

He also had stints on loan at Huachipato (1996), Atlético Huila (1998), Deportes Iquique (1998) and Deportes Puerto Montt (2000).

In his last seasons, he played for Deportes Talcahuano and retired in 2003.

At international level, he represented Chile at under-20 level in the 1992 South American Championship, alongside successful players such as Marcelo Salas, Clarence Acuña and Francisco Rojas.

Personal life
Escalona has worked in the administrative area of ASMAR, a Chilean state-owned shipbuilding company.

References

External links
 
 

1973 births
Living people
Chilean footballers
Chilean expatriate footballers
Chile under-20 international footballers
C.D. Huachipato footballers
Cortuluá footballers
Atlético Huila footballers
Deportes Iquique footballers
Puerto Montt footballers
Naval de Talcahuano footballers
Chilean Primera División players
Categoría Primera A players
Primera B de Chile players
Association football midfielders
Chilean expatriate sportspeople in Colombia
Expatriate footballers in Colombia
Place of birth missing (living people)